Zaida Bergroth (born 8 February 1977)  is a Finnish film director best known for her 2020 film Tove.

Career 
Bergroth was born in Kivijärvi in 1977. She graduated from the Aalto University School of Arts, Design and Architecture in 2004. Her first feature, Last Cowboy Standing was released in 2009. In 2019 it was announced that she would direct a biopic on the Moomin author Tove Jansson, titled Tove, which was released in 2020.

Selected filmography 

 Hair (1999) (short) (writer and director)
 Lasileuka [Glass Jaw] (2004) (short) (writer and director)
 Heavy Metal (2007) (short) (writer and director)
 Kunnanjohtaja (2007) (short) (writer and director)
 Last Cowboy Standing (2009) (screenplay and director)
 The Good Son (2011) (writer and director)
 Miami (2017) (writer and director)
 Maria’s Paradise (2019) (director)
 Tove (2020) (director)
 Kristal (2020) (short) (writer and director)

Personal life 
Bergroth has a sister, writer Aina Bergroth, and her mother is the painter Marjatta Tapiola.

See also
 List of female film and television directors
 List of LGBT-related films directed by women

References 

Living people
1977 births
Finnish film directors
Finnish women film directors
People from Kivijärvi
20th-century Finnish people
21st-century Finnish people